Top Gear: Bolivia Special is a special 76-minute episode of the motoring series Top Gear, originally broadcast on BBC Two in the United Kingdom at 19:45 on 27 December 2009. This is episode 6 of series 14.

It features the presenters James May, Jeremy Clarkson, and Richard Hammond travelling  through South America from the rainforests of Bolivia to the Pacific coast of Chile.  The presenters used second hand off-road vehicles, bought locally in Bolivia for less than £3,500 each. Unlike previous Top Gear Specials, a backup vehicle was not featured (usually one which is disliked by the presenters).

Route
The three presenters started at a riverside in the Amazon jungle, dropped off by boat (the presenters were supposed to have been helicoptered in to the location, but Clarkson said that the helicopter had crashed before filming).  Eventually a raft arrived with their cars on board, but it is just parked vaguely near the bank. All three, after boarding, remarked on their vehicles: Clarkson had bought a Range Rover Classic (which had been described as having a 3.9 L engine, but was actually found to be a 3.5 when inspected), May had a Suzuki SJ413 (which not only had flat tires, but also was meant to be blue not red), and Richard had a Toyota Land Cruiser 40 (with a broken side window, and an amateur effort to make it a convertible with a canopy roof).

While trying to move the raft closer to the shore, Clarkson began to sink into the mudflats, and had to be hauled out with his own Range Rover. Further trouble ensued, as Hammond's car would not start and the raft was too small for a push-start. It was not until the next morning that May realised that some of the planks on the raft were long enough to make a ramp off. James tried to get off first, but got stuck up a small hill just after disembarking. As May was blocking the path, they had to get a third plank to get Clarkson's Rover off. When he managed this, he first pulled May's Suzuki up the hill, and into a log, then towed Hammond's Cruiser off onto the shore, before then giving him a pull-start.  The trio were then provided with a supply of items to help them with their journey from the rainforest to the Pacific coastline, including a chainsaw, car winch, Tampax tampons, Durex condoms and Viagra tablets.

For the first section of the journey through the rainforest (which took three days), they were forced to make a route by slashing undergrowth and travelling along logging trails, encountering snakes and insects, and coping with the heat; Hammond suffered a poor first night, thanks to his phobia of insects. When the group encountered a small, steep gully, Clarkson tried to drive across, but failed and got his Range Rover stuck. May tried to winch him out, but ended up pulling his own vehicle into the gully, so Hammond had to winch both back to the starting point. Using the chainsaw and some rope, they made a bridge out of the trunks of four young trees to complete the crossing. During the second day, several fan blades were broken off Clarkson's engine, which led to him cutting holes in the bonnet for additional ventilation; this resulted in the roof of Hammond's Toyota catching fire. For the third day, the cars had to undergo some minor modifications to cross a river, including non-standard use of certain products: Clarkson used Tampax tampons to waterproof his fuel tank cap, and Vaseline and Durex condoms were used to waterproof various parts of the engines. Hammond got through the river without problems, but Clarkson stalled, and May promptly got stuck after driving round. As Hammond was winching May out, Clarkson got his car started without any problems, which seriously annoyed May. After journeying out of the rainforest, the group finally found a road, though both Hammond and May suffered from their vehicles' poor ride a few minutes later.  Jeremy Clarkson was able to enjoy the superior ride quality afforded by the Range Rover's coil spring suspension.

The next day saw the presenters travel to Bolivia's capital, La Paz, along the Yungas Road, which was also known as the 'Death Road', due to its narrowness and sheer drops that had claimed lives. Due to May's fear of heights, he threatened to cut anyone's head off if they bumped into him, later waving a machete near Clarkson's face after an accident. Later, Hammond drove into a ditch to avoid a passing bus, and found out that May's car's winch was broken. Clarkson, having already left the pair behind following May's car failing from river dust, was placed in extreme danger when he met a car coming the other way on a particularly narrow crumbling section. At the summit, he held a brief memorial service for Hammond and May, jokingly suggesting that they must be dead.

After all three were reunited, the trio modified their cars in La Paz to climb over the Andes, during their border crossing between Bolivia to Chile. Clarkson and Hammond both fitted much bigger wheels and tyres on their cars, but this increased the effective gear ratio and had a negative effect upon their performance, as it overworked their drivetrains and engines. Hammond also got rid of his roof, replacing it with a lighter rollbar (though exposing himself to the cold altitudes proved a bad idea); May simply 'mended' his car. On the next day, they crossed the Altiplano. They tried to take a straight route into Chile over the Guallatiri active volcano. Lack of oxygen also reduced each of their cars' effective power; May's car could produce no more than 20 bhp. At 17,200 feet altitude (3.26 miles, 5,240 metres, where the air pressure was about half an atmosphere), they stopped and appraised their current medical state. All three were displaying clear signs of altitude sickness and as the road was continuing to climb, the trio decided it was too risky, and so turned back and took a lower route.

Having passed the Andes, the group began travelling upon the Pan-American Highway, but the modifications on Hammond's cruiser caused serious issues; having already suffered a sheared front spring, the prop shaft had come apart and the diff had broken. After repairing and reuniting with the others, they found out, just a few miles from the end of their journey after driving off the highway, that their route would take them down a very steep sand dune to reach the Pacific coast, on Caleta Los Verdes, some 20 kilometres south of Iquique. They initially decided to practice on a less steep dune. Just prior to starting their practice run, Hammond got out to talk to Clarkson, 'forgetting' that his handbrake was broken and that he had left the Toyota in neutral. The car began rolling down the dune driverless and rolled over, losing a wheel in the process. The broken wheel hub meant the end for the Toyota, but Clarkson and May completed the dangerous descent.

After descending on foot to the coastline Hammond was forced to admit the defeat of the Land Cruiser, but he still argued that he had chosen wisely. Clarkson observed that May's Suzuki may have completed the journey, but it had been a very rough ride; May agreed, saying, "(t)he ride is rotten". Due to the Toyota's failure and the Suzuki's hard ride, Clarkson declared that although the Range Rover Classic was the most unreliable car in the world, it had proven itself to be the most reliable car in the world.

Although it was not mentioned on the show, some of the images show them passing along Lago Chungara (approx 4600 m in elevation) and the Parinacota volcano near this lake in the Lauca National Park. These came into view just before the three began their drive up the Guallatiri volcano.

Vehicles 
Each of the three presenters was allowed a £3,500 budget which they could use to buy second-hand cars online via the Internet, without being able to inspect the cars before purchase.

Richard Hammond bought a tan Toyota Land Cruiser 40 which had been badly converted into a soft top convertible by a previous owner. Part of this roof was set alight when Clarkson used an angle grinder to cut air vents in the bonnet of his Range Rover. Despite the Toyota's reputation for durability, it turned out to be the most unreliable car, suffering multiple drivetrain and suspension breakdowns right from the start. The modifications for the crossing of the Andes made the problems even worse due to the increased gearing putting considerable stress on the drivetrain and engine. It was eventually converted to front-wheel drive after the rear prop shaft broke off, destroying the rear differential. It was damaged beyond repair on the sand-dune descent. His car was nicknamed the "Donkey."

Jeremy Clarkson bought a red Range Rover Classic which he believed had a 3.9-litre fuel injected engine. However, when he showed his co-presenters under the bonnet, May noted it had carburettors, making it the 3.5-litre model. It became notorious for overheating and stopped working on some occasions, but it was very capable of dealing with the rough terrain. However, during the trip, none of the Range Rover's features were shown to be working, "apart from the de-mist!" Like Hammond's Toyota, it underwent modifications to handle the high-altitude part of the trip. Unlike the Toyota, however, it survived the trip, and was declared the winner, much to the amusement of the presenters, who had previously deemed it the most unreliable car, hence Clarkson's conclusion that "the most unreliable car in the world is the most reliable car in the world."

James May bought a Suzuki SJ413 which "...was blue in the picture," but red when delivered. The Suzuki had a 1.3-litre engine and was the smallest of the three vehicles. Despite this, it did not undergo modifications, and broke down the least (the main reason for it breaking down was when water entered the fuel tank while fording the jungle river). One disadvantage of this vehicle was its broken 4-wheel drive system, which made it a "3-wheel drive system;" May had not engaged one of the free-wheeling hubs to the lock position. Another major problem was that the alternator was broken, requiring his car battery to be swapped with Hammond's. It was still a very capable off-roader, especially when its small engine and size are considered, but the ride was consistently dreadful.

References

Further reading 
 
 

Bolivia
2009 in Bolivia
2009 in British television
2009 television specials